Fly on the Wall is the ninth studio album by Australian hard rock band AC/DC, released on 28 June 1985 by Albert Productions, and Atlantic Records. The album was re-released in 2003 as part of the AC/DC Remasters series.

Background
Although AC/DC's 1983 album Flick of the Switch received mixed reviews from critics, the band remained one of the biggest hard rock acts in the world. In October 1984, Atlantic Records released in the United States the EP '74 Jailbreak, a collection of studio tracks previously unreleased outside Australia, taken mainly from the band's 1975 Australian debut High Voltage. In January 1985, the band took three weeks off from recording what would become Fly on the Wall to headline two nights at the 10-day Rock in Rio festival in Rio de Janeiro, Brazil, appearing to over 250,000 people on 19 January with Scorpions, Whitesnake, and Ozzy Osbourne.

Recording and release
The sessions for Fly on the Wall took place at Mountain Studios in Montreux, Switzerland in late October 1984. Released on 28 June 1985, it was AC/DC's first album since the Australian release of T.N.T. not to include drummer Phil Rudd, who was replaced by Simon Wright (although Wright appeared in music videos for Flick of the Switch tracks), making it the first AC/DC album with all band members born in the UK.

It was the second and last album to be produced by band members. But in contrast to the preceding Flick of the Switch – produced by the band as a whole – Fly on the Wall was produced by guitarists Angus and Malcolm Young, who hoped to capture the rawness and simplicity of their early work in a time when pop-oriented glam metal had become popular. In a 1985 interview with Sky Channel for the Monsters of Rock show, Brian Johnson explained: "In my experience, the lads went in with a producer, but they were still really telling the lad what they wanted, so in a round-about way all it is an extra pair of ears. An expensive extra pair of ears."

The album was not well received by critics and its one million US sales paled beside those of Back in Black and For Those About to Rock We Salute You. The singles "Shake Your Foundations" and "Sink the Pink" are seen as standouts; both were later included on the band's soundtrack album Who Made Who for Stephen King's film Maximum Overdrive. The song "Danger" fell flat in concert and was banished from the set. Some critics also complained that Johnson's vocals were difficult to decipher, and the band would indeed raise them in the mix for Who Made Who.

The album does, however, have at least one high-profile fan: singer/songwriter Ryan Adams, who said "I had an epiphany while I was running and some songs from Fly on the Wall came on. That's a record I could always put on my run mix and I don't have to leave any songs off."

A home video of AC/DC performing five songs from the album was released in the summer of 1985. Also titled Fly on the Wall, it features the band playing "Fly on the Wall", "Danger", "Sink the Pink", "Stand Up", and "Shake Your Foundations" at a small bar in New York City named The Crystal Ballroom. At the bar, a photographer attempts to sneak in to take pictures of the band. New characters are introduced during each song, including three suit-clad men and two women during "Stand Up", and a lady dressed in pink during "Sink the Pink". The cartoon fly depicted on the album cover is also seen. If nothing else, the video demonstrated the band's new commitment to the now powerful MTV by going beyond performance-based videos.

The Fly on the Wall Tour was marred by bad publicity when serial killer Richard Ramirez was arrested. Ramirez, nicknamed the "Night Stalker" by the press, told police that "Night Prowler" from the 1979 Highway to Hell album had driven him to commit murder. Police also claimed that Ramirez was wearing an AC/DC shirt and left an AC/DC hat at one of the crime scenes. As Murray Engelheart observes in his book AC/DC: Maximum Rock & Roll, "It was just what the band's detractors had been waiting for and the media, especially in America, immediately seized on the case. Wild accusations that AC/DC were, in fact, devil worshippers were bandied about... The lyrics of 'Night Prowler' were carefully analysed and some newspapers attempted to link Ramirez's Satanism with AC/DC's name, somehow arriving at the conclusion that AC/DC actually stood for Anti-Christ, Devil's Child."

The band maintained that the song had been given a murderous connotation by Ramírez, but is actually about a boy sneaking into his girlfriend's bedroom at night while her parents are asleep. In a 2000 interview for the MuchMoreMusic documentary The Story of AC/DC, Angus says wryly, "I can't remember the last black mass I attended."

Reception

In the original Rolling Stone review of the album, Tim Holmes wrote, "You'd never guess how sexist and politically incorrect all this is if you didn't read the lyric sheet, because you sure can't make out a single word coming out of the dentist's-drill glottis of Brian Johnson (except maybe the song titles, which tend to be repeated like mantras). Angus Young is also in great form, playing the dumbest, most irresistibly repetitive chords in the lexicon." According to Steve Huey of AllMusic, "Fly on the Wall continues AC/DC's descent into cookie-cutter mediocrity, with the leering humor of past glories seeming forced and uninspired, and the music remaining somewhat underdeveloped and directionless." In his 1994 Bon Scott biography Highway to Hell, author Clinton Walker calls the album a "disaster". Martin Popoff observed how Fly on the Wall "tries desperately to recapture wasted youth, yet the material for the most part is cookie-cutter AC/DC" and remarked Brian Johnson's awkward vocals "mixed quite far back, possibly because he's sounding raspier and more incoherent than ever". US gossip magazine People picked the LP as best album of 1985.

Track listing

Personnel
Brian Johnson – lead vocals
Angus Young – lead guitar
Malcolm Young – rhythm guitar, backing vocals
Cliff Williams – bass guitar, backing vocals
Simon Wright – drums, percussion

Production
Produced by Angus and Malcolm Young
Mark Dearnley – engineer
Bob Defrin – art director
Todd Schorr – cover illustration
SMAY Vision – booklet design (reissue)
Ebet Roberts, George Bodnar, Barry Plummer – photography

Charts

Weekly chart

Certifications

References

External links
Lyrics on AC/DC's official website

1985 albums
AC/DC albums
Atlantic Records albums
Albert Productions albums